Tell Me That You Love Me is a Canadian-Israeli coproduced drama film, directed by Tzipi Trope and released in 1983. The film stars Nick Mancuso and Barbara Williams as Dan and Miri, a couple in Tel Aviv whose marriage is running into trouble; meanwhile Miri, a journalist, begins to write a story about spousal abuse when she meets Naomi (Andrée Pelletier), a woman who is being abused by her husband David (Kenneth Welsh).

The film was poorly received by critics. Gerald Pratley called it "a protracted, poorly written and unreal story of a failed marriage", while Greg Quill of the Toronto Star wrote that "The only relief from all this dreary anguish is temporary separation. Dan takes a job for a year in New York, Miri works out The Meaning Of Life at home. By then, of course, we couldn't care less about their relationship, about the long, sad silences these two greedy, self-centred people share at the nadir of their married life. Let's just hope they get their just desserts: another 50 years together."

Welsh received a Genie Award nomination for Best Supporting Actor at the 5th Genie Awards in 1984.

References

External links

1983 films
Canadian drama films
Israeli drama films
English-language Canadian films
English-language Israeli films
1980s English-language films
1980s Canadian films